Ernest Higa (October 15, 1952) is an entrepreneur who founded the Domino's Pizza franchise in Japan. 

Higa was born on October 15, 1952 in Honolulu, Hawaii. He is of Okinawan descent. His father is Yetsuo Higa and his sister is Merle Aiko Okawara. He graduated from Columbia University.

Higa founded the first Japanese Domino's Pizza branch in 1985.  He is a member of Keizai Dōyukai, a major Japanese business group. In December 2011 he helped Wendy's return to Japan.

References

1952 births
Living people
Columbia University alumni
Domino's Pizza
People from Honolulu
American School in Japan alumni
American people of Okinawan descent
American company founders
American expatriates in Japan